Interstate 80 (I-80) is an east–west transcontinental freeway that crosses the United States from downtown San Francisco, California, to Teaneck, New Jersey, in the New York metropolitan area. The highway was designated in 1956 as one of the original routes of the Interstate Highway System; its final segment was opened in 1986. The second-longest Interstate Highway in the United States after I-90, it runs through many major cities, including Oakland, Sacramento, Reno, Salt Lake City, Omaha, Des Moines, and Toledo and passes within  of Chicago, Cleveland, and New York City.

I-80 is the Interstate Highway that most closely approximates the route of the historic Lincoln Highway, the first road across the United States. The highway roughly traces other historically significant travel routes in the Western United States: the Oregon Trail across Wyoming and Nebraska, the California Trail across most of Nevada and California, the first transcontinental airmail route, and the route of the first transcontinental railroad, except for the vicinity of the Great Salt Lake. From near Chicago east to near Youngstown, Ohio, I-80 is a toll road, containing most of both the Indiana Toll Road and the Ohio Turnpike. I-80 runs concurrently with I-90 from near Portage, Indiana, to Elyria, Ohio. In Pennsylvania, I-80 is known as the Keystone Shortway, a non-tolled freeway that crosses rural north-central portions of the state on the way to New Jersey and New York City.

Route description

|-
|CA
|
|-
|NV
|
|-
|UT
|
|-
|WY
|
|-
|NE
|
|-
|IA
|
|-
|IL
|
|-
|IN
|
|-
|OH
|
|-
|PA
|
|-
|NJ
|
|- class="sortbottom"
|Total
|
|}

California

I-80 begins at an interchange with US Route 101 (US 101) in San Francisco and then crosses the San Francisco–Oakland Bay Bridge into Oakland. It then heads northeast through Vallejo, Sacramento, and the Sierra Nevada before crossing into Nevada.

A portion of the route through Pinole involved the experimental transplantation of the rare species Santa Cruz tarplant in the right-of-way.

Nevada

In Nevada, I-80 traverses the northern portion of the state. The freeway serves the Reno metropolitan area, and it also goes through the towns of Fernley, Lovelock, Winnemucca, Battle Mountain, Elko, Wells, and West Wendover on its way through the state.

The Nevada portion of I-80 follows the paths of the Truckee and Humboldt rivers, which have been used as a transportation corridor since the California Gold Rush of the 1840s. The Interstate also follows the historical routes of the California Trail, first transcontinental railroad, and Feather River Route throughout portions of the state. I-80 in Nevada closely follows, and at many points directly overlaps, the original route of the Victory Highway, State Route 1 (SR 1), and US 40.

Utah

After crossing Utah's western border in Wendover, I-80 crosses the desolate Bonneville Salt Flats west of the Great Salt Lake. This portion of I-80, crossing the Great Salt Lake Desert, is extremely flat and straight, dotted with large warning signs about driver fatigue and drowsiness.

East of the salt flats, I-80 passes the southern edge of Great Salt Lake and continues on through Salt Lake City, where it merges with I-15 for  before entering the Wasatch Range east of the city. It ascends Parleys Canyon and passes within a few miles of Park City as it follows a route through the mountains toward the junction with the eastern terminus of the western section of I-84. From the junction it continues up Echo Canyon and on toward the border with Wyoming, near Evanston.

The route of the Utah section of I-80 is defined in Utah Code Annotated § 72-4-113(10).

Wyoming

Farther west in Wyoming, the Interstate passes through the dry Red Desert and over the Continental Divide. In a way, the highway crosses the Divide twice, since two ridges of the Rocky Mountains split in Wyoming, forming the endorheic Great Divide Basin, from which surface water cannot drain but can only evaporate.

Nebraska

I-80 enters Nebraska west of Bushnell. The western portion of I-80 in Nebraska runs very close to the state of Colorado, without entering the state. The intersection of I-76 and I-80 is visible from the Colorado–Nebraska state line. From its intersection with I-76 to Grand Island, I-80 lies in the valley of the South Platte River and the Platte River.

Along this length, the road does not vary from an ideally straight line by more than a few yards. After Lincoln, I-80 turns northeast toward Omaha. It then crosses the Missouri River in Omaha to enter the state of Iowa. Part of I-80 in Nebraska is marked as a Blue Star Memorial Highway.

Iowa

I-80 is the longest Interstate Highway in Iowa. It extends from west to east across the central portion of the state through the population centers of Council Bluffs, Des Moines, and the Quad Cities. It enters the state at the Missouri River in Council Bluffs and heads east through the southern Iowa drift plain. In the Des Moines metropolitan area, I-80 meets up with I-35 and the two routes bypass Downtown Des Moines together while I-235 proceeds straight through the metro and rejoins both on the far side. In Ankeny, the Interstates split and I-80 continues east. On the west edge of the Iowa City metropolitan area, it intersects I-380, a segment of the Avenue of the Saints. Northwest of the Quad Cities in Walcott is Iowa 80, the world's largest truckstop. I-80 passes along the northern edge of Davenport and Bettendorf and leaves Iowa via the Fred Schwengel Memorial Bridge over the Mississippi River into Illinois. The majority of the highway runs through farmland, yet roughly a third of Iowa's population live along the I-80 corridor.

Illinois

In Illinois, I-80 runs from the Fred Schwengel Memorial Bridge across the Mississippi River south to an intersection with I-74. It then runs east across north-central Illinois just north of the Illinois River to Joliet. I-80 continues east and joins I-94 just before entering Indiana.

Indiana

In Indiana, I-80 runs concurrently with another Interstate Highway for its entire length. It runs with I-94 on the Borman Expressway from the Illinois state line to Lake Station, Indiana, then with I-90 on the Indiana Toll Road from Lake Station to the Ohio state line.

Between La Porte and the Toledo metropolitan area, I-80/I-90 is located within  of the Michigan state line but does not enter that state. From the State Road 9 (SR 9) and I-80/I-90 interchange, the sign marking the Indiana–Michigan state line is visible. I-80/I-90 passes through the South Bend–Mishawaka metropolitan area, passing the University of Notre Dame and the University Park Mall, intersecting with the St. Joseph Valley Parkway.

Ohio

In Ohio, I-80/I-90 enters from the Indiana Toll Road and immediately becomes the Ohio Turnpike. The two Interstates cross rural northwest Ohio and run just south of the Toledo metropolitan area. In Rossford, the turnpike intersects I-75 in an area known as the Crossroads of America. This intersection is one of the largest intersections of three Interstate Highways in the United States.

In Elyria Township, just west of Cleveland, I-90 splits from I-80, leaving the turnpike and running northeast as a freeway. I-80 runs east-southeast through the southern suburbs of Cleveland. Just northwest of Youngstown, the Ohio Turnpike continues southeast as I-76, while I-80 exits the turnpike and runs east to the north of Youngstown, entering Pennsylvania south of Sharon, Pennsylvania.

Pennsylvania

In Pennsylvania, I-80 is the main east–west freeway through the central part of the state. It runs from the Ohio state line near Sharon to the Delaware Water Gap Toll Bridge over the Delaware River and is called the "Z.H. Confair Memorial Highway".

It traverses the extreme northern section of Greater Pittsburgh. I-80 serves as the western terminus for I-376 which connects it to Pittsburgh International Airport and on to Downtown Pittsburgh and suburban Pittsburgh. Further east, I-99 connects with State College and Altoona. A spur from I-80 (I-180) runs to Williamsport. Upon entering the Pocono Mountains region, I-80 meets I-81, connecting Syracuse, New York, and Harrisburg, and I-476 which connects with Scranton, Wilkes-Barre, Allentown, and Philadelphia. Another spur (I-380) runs to Scranton.

In Clearfield County, I-80 reaches its highest elevation east of the Mississippi River, although other Interstate Highways east of the Mississippi, including I-26 in North Carolina and Tennessee, reach higher elevations.

In 2007, the Pennsylvania Turnpike Commission (PTC), combined with state legislature Act No. 44, initiated plans to enact a tolling system on the entire span of I-80 throughout the commonwealth of Pennsylvania. On October 15, 2007, the Pennsylvania Department of Transportation (PennDOT) and the PTC signed a 50-year lease agreement, which would allow the PTC to maintain and, eventually, toll I-80. However, the application for a toll was rejected by the Federal Highway Administration (FHWA).

New Jersey

I-80 does not enter New York City. Once the I-95/New Jersey Turnpike was extended in 1971 from its former terminus at US 46 in Ridgefield to I-80 in Teaneck, the section from Teaneck to Fort Lee was resigned as I-95, and it is the latter roadway that enters New York City via the George Washington Bridge. I-80's designated end (as per signage and New Jersey Department of Transportation (NJDOT) documents) is  short of New York City in Teaneck, before the Degraw Avenue overpass. There, signs designate the end of I-80 and the beginning of I-95/New Jersey Turnpike northbound.

Therefore, the fact that exit numbers on I-95 beyond the end of I-80 appear to be a continuation of I-80 exit numbers is a coincidence. They match what would have been the correct milemarkers of I-95 had the Somerset Freeway been built.

One section of I-80 running from Netcong to Denville was constructed in 1958.

History
I-80 was included in the original plan for the Interstate Highway System as approved in 1956. The highway was built in segments, with the final piece of I-80 completed in 1986 on the western edge of Salt Lake City. This piece was coincidentally dedicated close to the 30th birthday of the Interstate Highway System, which was noted at the dedication and considered to be a milestone in the history of highway construction in the United States.

Geological study
John McPhee described the geology revealed by the building of I-80 in a series of books on the formation of the continent of North America, books that were published between 1981 and 1993 and collected in a one-volume edition in 1998 Annals of the Former World which won a Pulitzer Prize in 1999. In "Basin and Range" (1981), he described how the idea emerged in a conversation with Princeton geologist Kenneth S. Deffeyes: "What about Interstate 80, I asked him. It goes the distance. How would it be? 'Absorbing,' he said. And he mused aloud: After 80 crosses the Border Fault, it pussyfoots along on morainal till that levelled up the fingers of the foldbelt hills. It does a similar dance with glacial debris in parts of Pennsylvania. It needs no assistance on the craton. It climbs a ramp to the Rockies and a fault-block staircase up the front of the Sierra. It is geologically shrewd. It was the route of animal migrations, and of human history that followed. It avoids melodrama, avoids the Grand Canyons, the Jackson Holes, the geologic operas of the country, but it would surely be a sound experience of the big picture, of the history, the construction, the components of the continent."

Junction list
California
  in San Francisco
  in Oakland
  on the Oakland–Emeryville city line. The highways travel concurrently to Albany.
  in Vallejo
  in Fairfield
  in Vacaville
  in West Sacramento
  in Sacramento
Nevada
  in Reno
  south-southwest of Lovelock. The highways travel concurrently to Winnemucca.
  in Wells
Utah
  in Salt Lake City
  in Salt Lake City. The highways travel concurrently to South Salt Lake.
  in South Salt Lake
  southeast of Salt Lake City
  in Silver Creek Junction. I-80/US 189 travels concurrently to east-northeast of Evanston, Wyoming.
  in Echo
Wyoming
  in Little America. The highways travel concurrently to south-southeast of Walcott.
  in Purple Sage. The highways travel concurrently to Rock Springs.
  east of Rawlins. The highways travel concurrently to south-southeast of Walcott.
  in Laramie. I-80 / US 30 travel concurrently to southwest of Cheyenne.
  southwest of Cheyenne
  on the Fox Farm–Cheyenne line
  east-northeast of Cheyenne. The highways travel concurrently to Pine Bluffs.
Nebraska
  southwest of Big Springs
 southwest of Big Springs
  in Ogallala
  in North Platte
  south of Lexington
  south of Elm Creek
  south of Grand Island
  in York
  in Lincoln
  in Lincoln. The highways travel concurrently to north-northeast of Lincoln.
  in Lincoln
  in Waverly
  in Omaha
  in Omaha
  in Omaha
Iowa
  in Council Bluffs. The highways travel concurrently through Council Bluffs.
  in Council Bluffs
  northwest of Minden
  in Avoca
  north-northeast of Lorah. I-80/US 6 travel concurrently to De Soto.
  in De Soto
  in West Des Moines. I-35/I-80 travels concurrently to Ankeny.
  on the Clive–Urbandale city line
  in Des Moines
  in Ankeny
  in Altoona. The highways travel concurrently through Altoona.
  in Altoona. I-80/US 6 travels concurrently to Newton.
  south of Malcom
  east-northeast of Williamsburg
  on the Tiffin–Coralville city line
  north-northwest of Wilton. The highways travel concurrently to Davenport.
  in Davenport. I-80/US 61 travels concurrently through Davenport.
  in Davenport
  in Le Claire
Illinois
  in East Moline
  in Colona
  in Colona
  northeast of Princeton
  in LaSalle
  in Channahon
  in Joliet
  in New Lenox
  in New Lenox
  on the Mokena–Orland Park–Tinley Park city line
  in Country Club Hills
  in Hazel Crest. The highways travel concurrently to the South Holland–Lansing village line.
  on the South Holland–Lansing village line. I-80/I-94 travels concurrently to Lake Station, Indiana.
  in Lansing. The highways travel concurrently to Lake Station, Indiana.
Indiana
  in Hammond. The highways travel concurrently through Hammond.
  in Gary
  in Lake Station. I-80/I-90 travels concurrently to northwest of Elyria, Ohio.
  southeast of Otis
  in South Bend
  north-northeast of Middlebury
  west-northwest of Fremont
Ohio
  in Maumee
  in Perrysburg
  northeast of Stony Ridge
  north-northwest of Milan
  in North Ridgeville
  in Strongsville
  on the Richfield–Brecksville line
  in Streetsboro
  east-southeast of North Jackson
  in Mineral Ridge
  in Girard
  north of Hubbard
Pennsylvania
  south of Hermitage
  south of Mercer
  northwest of Grove City
  west of Corsica
  east-northeast of Falls Creek
  northwest of Zion. I-80/US 220 travels concurrently to east of Mackeyville.
  north of New Columbia
  northeast of New Columbia
  in Lime Ridge
  north-northwest of Drums
  east of East Side
  south-southwest of Pocono Summit
  in Arlington Heights. The highways travel concurrently to east of East Stroudsburg.
New Jersey
  in Columbia
  west of Stanhope. The highways travel concurrently to south-southeast of Netcong.
  in Netcong
  east of Rockaway
  in Parsippany-Troy Hills
  in Parsippany-Troy Hills
  in Parsippany-Troy Hills
  in Parsippany-Troy Hills
  in Wayne
  in Teaneck

See also

References

External links

 
 Eric Buchanan's Interstate 80 Photos Index page

 
80
80
80